Zar Ni Myo Nyunt,  on 6 February 1978), better known as R Zar Ni (is a Burmese singer. He is best known for Burmese language covers of Western and Asian (Cantopop, Mandopop K-pop) pop songs. He was the winner of the "Most Popular Male Recording Artist Award" given by Yangon City FM, a pop-oriented radio station for years 2007 to 2009.

Early life
R Zarni was born Zarni Myo Nyunt to Myo Lwin and Kaythwe Nyunt in Yangon. He has a younger brother, Thiha Myo Nyunt, who is an aspiring singer with the stage name of M Thiha. Zarni grew up in Tamwe Township, and learned to play the guitar at Sixth Standard. After failing the university matriculation exam, he first tried to become a sailor. By accident, he was discovered to become a singer. In 2018, he had contracted to become a judge in the second season of The Voice Myanmar.After severing as a judge in season 2, he continued in season 3.

Political activities
Following the 2021 Myanmar coup d'état, R Zarni was active in the anti-coup movement both in person at rallies and through social media. He joined the "We Want Justice" three-finger salute movement. The movement was launched on social media, and many celebrities have joined the movement. On 2 April 2021, warrants for his arrest were issued under section 505 (a) of the Myanmar Penal Code by the State Administration Council for speaking out against the military coup. Along with several other celebrities, he was charged with calling for participation in the Civil Disobedience Movement (CDM) and damaging the state's ability to govern, with supporting the Committee Representing Pyidaungsu Hluttaw, and with generally inciting the people to disturb the peace and stability of the nation.

Discography
R Zarni has released just three solo albums. Most of his recordings were released as part of collaborative albums with various artists.

Solo albums
 Nga-Go Chit-Te-Thu (2001)
 Si Ta-Hpet-Cha (2004)
 A-hseit Tet Einmet (2010)
 Eaint-mat Yin Saunt (2016)

References

21st-century Burmese male singers
Living people
1978 births
People from Yangon
Burmese pop singers